Humlebæk Station is a railway station serving the suburb of Humlebæk in North Zealand, Denmark, circa 35 km north of central Copenhagen, as well as the nearby Louisiana Museum of Modern Art.

The station is located on the Coast Line between Helsingør and Copenhagen. The train services are operated by the railway company DSB, which runs a frequent regional rail service between Helsingør and Copenhagen Central Station.

The station building from 1897 is designed by Heinrich Wenck. It is on the East side of the tracks. The shopping mall Humlebæk Center is on the West side.

See also
 List of railway stations in Denmark

External links

Humlebæk Station  on DSB's website.

Coast Line (Denmark)
Railway stations in the Capital Region of Denmark
Buildings and structures in Fredensborg Municipality
Railway stations opened in 1897
National Romantic architecture in Denmark
Heinrich Wenck buildings
Railway stations in the Øresund Region
Railway stations in Denmark opened in the 19th century